Amsarqışlaq is a village and municipality in the Quba Rayon of Azerbaijan.

References

Populated places in Quba District (Azerbaijan)